Jessica McKenna is an American actress and comedian. McKenna trained with The Groundlings and at the Upright Citizens Brigade Theatre, where she regularly performs. McKenna was one of the stars of Fox's Party Over Here, alongside Nicole Byer and Alison Rich, and currently hosts the podcast Off Book: The Improvised Musical.

Early life
McKenna was born in Yorba Linda, California. She received a bachelor's degree in theater from Northwestern University.

Career

Theater 
McKenna began training at the Upright Citizens Brigade Theatre after college, and became a regular performer in 2012. She regularly performs with the musical improv house teams, Magic to Do and Baby Wants Candy. McKenna is also a frequent performer at the Upright Citizens Brigade Theatre's long-running improv show, ASSSSCAT. McKenna has performed improv comedy at festivals including South by Southwest, SF Sketchfest, Edinburgh Fringe, the Del Close Marathon, Bumbershoot, and Chicago Sketch Fest.

Television, film, and web series 
In 2014, McKenna was a regular cast member on Fox's improv-based game show, Riot, until its cancellation. In 2016, McKenna starred alongside fellow Upright Citizens Brigade (UCB) alumnae Nicole Byer and Alison Rich in Fox's sketch comedy show, Party Over Here, which was produced by The Lonely Island and Paul Scheer. Party Over Here was cancelled after one season. McKenna has appeared in episodes of Modern Family and The Goldbergs.

McKenna often collaborates with UCB alumnus Zach Reino. McKenna and Reino have worked together on musical sketches for Funny or Die, BuzzFeed, and Nickelodeon. In 2016, McKenna and Reino wrote and starred together in ABC's web series, Serious Music. Along with Zeke Nicholson, the pair also featured in an episode of Dropout series Game Changer titled "The Official Cast Recording", in which they improvised a short musical based on host Sam Reich's prompts. This was later adapted into a full series on Dropout titled Play It By Ear.

McKenna also works as a voice actress. McKenna voices the lead character, Lennon, on Amazon's Little Big Awesome. It was originally announced that McKenna would voice the lead character on Billy Dilley's Super-Duper Subterranean Summer, however, creator Aaron Springer ultimately was cast in that role.

In 2022, McKenna, along with Neil Casey, Zach Reino, and Niccole Thurman, won the Writers Guild of America Award in the category "Quiz and Audience Participation" for her work on the series Baking It. In 2023, she was nominated again for the same award together with the other writers of Baking It.

Podcasts 
Since 2017, McKenna and Reino have hosted the musical comedy podcast Off Book: The Improvised Musical, which was initially on the Earwolf network. McKenna is also a regular guest on the podcast version of Comedy Bang! Bang!, where she is known for characters such as Beth, the Power Wheels–obsessed eight-year-old, and This Is Your Boy Troy. McKenna has also appeared on Improv4Humans, Doughboys, The JV Club, and Hollywood Handbook.

Filmography

Film

Television

Video games

References

External links
 

Living people
American podcasters
American television actresses
American voice actresses
American women podcasters
People from Yorba Linda, California
Northwestern University alumni
Upright Citizens Brigade Theater performers
21st-century American actresses
Year of birth missing (living people)